The Gleneagles Dialog is a summit (meeting) of the environment and energy ministers from the G8 countries Canada, France, Germany, Italy, Japan, Russia, United Kingdom, and the United States, as well as from Australia, Brazil, China, India, Indonesia, Mexico, Nigeria, Poland, South Africa, South Korea, Spain, and the European Union.

External links
"Third meeting of the Energy and Environment Ministers"
Outline of the Gleneagles Dialogue 2008 in Kōbe, Japan 
Informationen zur Dritten Konferenz der Energie- und Umweltminister vom 9.-11. September 2007 in Berlin; Bundesumweltministerium
 Gleneagles Dialogue ; British G8-Presidency 2005

G7 summits